Alfred Stäger (born 5 October 1924) was a Swiss alpine skier. He competed in the men's downhill at the 1948 Winter Olympics.

References

External links
  

1924 births
Possibly living people
Swiss male alpine skiers
Olympic alpine skiers of Switzerland
Alpine skiers at the 1948 Winter Olympics
Place of birth missing